The aryl-hydrocarbon receptor repressor also known as AHRR is a human gene.

Function
Dioxins and dioxin-like compounds are teratogens that exert their effects through the aryl hydrocarbon receptor (AhR) in conjunction with the receptor's binding partner, aryl hydrocarbon receptor nuclear translocator (ARNT). The protein encoded by this gene represses signal transduction by the AhR by competing with the arylhydrocarbon receptor for binding to the ARNT. Expression of the repressor is stimulated by the receptor/translocator heterodimer, thereby regulating receptor function through a negative feedback mechanism. In addition, the encoded protein can bind to nuclear factor-kappa B.

The AhRR gene may act as a tumor suppressor.

Tissue distribution
The expression of AhRR is high in testis, lung, ovary, spleen and pancreas in adults, whereas expression is low in all tissues in fetuses.

References

External links
 

Transcription factors